Rui Pedro Silva (born 6 May 1981 in Santo Tirso) is a Portuguese track and field athlete specialized in long distance and cross country running.

With Benfica, he won the Portuguese Road Men's Championship on 12 January 2014, repeating the achievement of 2009. On 11 January 2015, he won the title again in the same competition.

Competition record

Personal Bests
1500m - 3:52.77 (2002)
3000m - 8:02.37 (2005)
5000m - 13:48.87 (2010)
10000m - 28:01.63 (2009)
3000m Steeplechase - 8:52.66 (2002)
Half Marathon - 1:02:38 (2012)
Marathon - 2:12:15 (2012)

References

External links

1981 births
Living people
People from Santo Tirso
Portuguese male middle-distance runners
Portuguese male long-distance runners
Olympic athletes of Portugal
Athletes (track and field) at the 2008 Summer Olympics
Athletes (track and field) at the 2012 Summer Olympics
S.L. Benfica athletes
Sportspeople from Porto District